Cornelius Wytfliet or Cornelis van Wytfliet (died around 1597) was a geographer from Leuven in the Habsburg Netherlands, best known for producing the first atlas of the Americas.

Life
Cornelius was the son of Catherine Huybrechts and her husband, Gregorius Wytfliet, who was advocate fiscal of Leuven University from 1557 to 1594.

After graduating Licentiate in Laws from the University of Leuven, Wytfliet moved to Brussels and became secretary to the Council of Brabant. He died in or shortly after 1597, when his Descriptionis Ptolemaicae Augmentum (a work adding new discoveries to Ptolemy's description of the world) was published.

Works
 Descriptionis Ptolemaicae Augmentum (Leuven, Joannes Bogardus, 1597)
 Reissued Leuven, Gerard Rivius, 1598 – On Google Books
 Translated into French as Histoire universelle des Indes occidentales (Douai, François Fabri, 1607) – On Google Books

References

Year of birth unknown
Year of death unknown
16th-century cartographers
Scientists from Leuven
Old University of Leuven alumni
Early modern Netherlandish cartography
Belgian cartographers
Flemish geographers